The Bobsleds is an in house Hybrid roller coaster at Seabreeze Amusement Park in Irondequoit, New York. The coaster opened in its current form in 1962 making it one of the first roller coasters in the world to use steel tubular track, second only to the Matterhorn Bobsleds at Disneyland.

History
In 1952, Seabreeze Amusement Park started construction on a new roller coaster with a wooden support structure and what is believed to have been an iron track. In 1954 the new coaster opened to the public with the name "Junior Coaster".. The ride operated in this form until 1961 when the ride would go through a major overhaul. The at the time park owner George W. Long had just returned from a vacation to Disneyland where he rode the state-of-the-art Matterhorn Bobsleds roller coaster. While on that trip George drew up plans on a napkin to redesign the "Junior Coaster" at his park into a toned-down Matterhorn Bobsleds. In the offseason between 1961 and 1962, the "Junior Coaster" was renamed into "Bobsleds", added a third story onto the ride, and giving the coaster steel tubular track. A hybrid coaster is a coaster made of steel and wood. Several other roller coasters have been hybrids with steel supports and a wooden track, but this coaster was one of the first in the world to use wooden supports and a steel track. The ride instantly became a fan favorite and has remained as such throughout the years. In 2019, 57 years after reopening as a hybrid coaster, Seabreeze began looking into replacing the ride since it had gotten rough and was a headache for the maintenance team. Luckily, Seabreeze was able to partner with Amuse Rides and acquire steel to fully retract the ride and redesign the trains. Brandon Paul, president of Amuse Rides thinks that Bobsleds should be around for at least another 60 years

References

Roller coasters in New York (state)
Hybrid roller coasters
Buildings and structures in Monroe County, New York